Lidia Castillejo (born 4 September 1969) is a Spanish gymnast. She competed in six events at the 1988 Summer Olympics.

References

External links
 

1969 births
Living people
Spanish female artistic gymnasts
Olympic gymnasts of Spain
Gymnasts at the 1988 Summer Olympics
Gymnasts from Barcelona
20th-century Spanish women